Gudibanda thanda is a village in Thorrur mandal, and a town in Mahabubabad district of Telangana, India. It is located on Jayaprakash Narayana road between Warangal and Khammam. It is at about 50 km from Warangal and 70 km from Khammam. It is a rapidly growing town due to its location. The distance between Hyderabad to Gudibanda thanda is 143  km

Nearby villages 
Nanchari Madur , Kodakandla, Palakurthi, Thorrur, Wardhannapet, Maripeda, Parvathagiri, Mahbubaubad Warangal.

Temples 
Dhurga Maatha Temple.

References  
 villageinfo.in

Villages in Mahabubabad district